Mika Toimi Waltari (19 September 1908 – 26 August 1979) was a Finnish writer, best known for his best-selling novel The Egyptian. He was extremely productive. Besides his novels he also wrote poetry, short stories, crime novels, plays, essays, travel stories, film scripts, and rhymed texts for comic strips by Asmo Alho.

Biography

Early life 
Waltari was born in Helsinki on 19 September 1908. His parents were Toimi Waltari and Olga Johansson; Toimi was a Lutheran pastor once, teaching religion in Porvoo, and Olga one of his pupils. A scandal caused by their relationship had forced them to move to Tampere and the two married on 18 November 1906. At the age of five Mika Waltari suddenly lost his father to illness on 5 July 1914, and the 25-year old Olga Waltari was left, with crucial help from Toimi's brother Toivo, to support her three children: Samuli (7 years), Mika (5 years) and Erkki (6 months). As a boy, Waltari witnessed the Finnish Civil War, during which his White-sided family fled to the home of his mother's aunt at Laukkoski in Pornainen, near Porvoo, which was relatively peaceful and where the Whites were predominant.

Later he enrolled in the University of Helsinki as a theology student, according to his uncle Toivo's wishes, but soon abandoned theology in favour of philosophy, aesthetics and literature, graduating in 1929. While studying, he contributed to various magazines  and wrote poetry and stories, getting his first book Jumalaa paossa published in 1925. It was a success, selling 3000 copies despite being only 72 pages long. In 1927, he went to Paris where he wrote his first major novel Suuri illusioni ('The Grand Illusion'), a story of bohemian life. In terms of style, the novel is considered to be the Finnish equivalent to the works of the American writers of the Lost Generation. (In Waltari's historical novel The Adventurer, taking place in the 16th century, the protagonist is a Finn who goes to study in Paris at much the same age that the author went to the same city in the 20th century). Suuri Illusioni was a surprise hit, selling 8000 copies and turning Mika Waltari into a famous author. Waltari also was, for a while, a member of the liberal literary movement Tulenkantajat, though his political and social views later turned conservative. He was married on 8 March 1931 to Marjatta Luukkonen, whom he had met during military service the preceding year, and on 4 January 1932 they had a daughter, Satu. Satu also became a writer.

Throughout the 1930s and 1940s, Waltari worked as a journalist and critic, writing for a number of newspapers and magazines and travelling widely in Europe. He directed the magazine Suomen  Kuvalehti. At the same time, he kept writing books in many genres, moving easily from one literary field to another. He had a very busy schedule and strict work ethic. He also suffered from manic-depressive psychosis and became depressed after completion of a book, sometimes to the extent of needing hospital treatment; in his manic phases he did his writing. He participated, and often succeeded, in literary competitions to prove the quality of his work to critics. One of these competitions gave rise to one of his most popular characters, Inspector Palmu, a gruff detective of the Helsinki police department, who starred in three mystery novels, all of which were filmed (a fourth film was made without Waltari involved). Waltari also scripted the popular cartoon Kieku ja Kaiku and wrote Aiotko kirjailijaksi, a guidebook for aspiring writers that influenced many younger writers such as Kalle Päätalo.

World War II and international break-through
During the Winter War (1939–1940) and the Continuation War (1941–1944), Waltari worked in the government information center, now also placing his literary skills at the service of political propaganda. According to historian Eino Jutikkala, through this experience as a propagandist Waltari became more cynical as he realised the prevalence of historical half-truths shaped by propaganda, later a recurrent theme in his historical novels. Although Waltari saw USSR Communism as dangerous, he was attracted to the National Socialist theories about a new man. He visited Germany in 1939 and wrote a mostly favourable article titled Tuntematon Saksa ('Unknown Germany'). In 1942 he and 6 other Finnish writers visited Germany to attend the Congress of the European Writers' Union in Weimar and wrote yet more favourable coverage; a story goes however that he, being slightly drunk, refused the pocket money brought by their "patient and attentive German hosts" to their hotel by tearing it in half and throwing it away through the window.

1945 saw the publication of Waltari's first and most successful historical novel, The Egyptian.  Its theme of the corruption of humanist values in a materialist world seemed curiously topical in the aftermath of World War II, and the book became an international bestseller, serving as the basis of the 1954 Hollywood movie of the same name. Waltari wrote seven more historical novels, placed in various ancient cultures, among others The Dark Angel, set during  the Fall of Constantinople in 1453. In these novels, he gave powerful expression to his fundamental pessimism and also, in two novels set in the Roman Empire, to his Christian conviction. After the war, he also wrote several novellas. He became a member of the Finnish Academy in 1957 and received an honorary doctorate at the University of Turku in 1970.

Later years 
Waltari's last two novels tell about  early history of Christianity: Valtakunnan salaisuus (English title: The Secret of the Kingdom 1959), and Ihmiskunnan viholliset (English title: The Roman 1964). As a member of Academy of Science and Letters he guided younger writers. He was also involved in re-publishing and editing his early works, and gave long interviews to Ritva Haavikko which were published as a book.

Waltari was one of the most prolific Finnish writers. He wrote at least 29 novels, 15 novellas, 6 collections of stories or fairy-tales, 6 collections of poetry and 26 plays, as well as screen plays, radio plays, non-fiction, translations, and hundreds of reviews and articles. He is also internationally the best-known Finnish writer, and his works have been translated into more than 30 languages.

In his later years, Waltari wrote less and less. This is partly due to the enormous fees he received from foreign editions of The Egyptian and his other books, allowing him to stop "writing to live".

Mika Waltari died on 26 August 1979 in Helsinki, the year after his wife Marjatta's death in 1978.

Literary themes and style
Markéta Hejkalová (who translated many Waltari's works into Czech and wrote a biography about him) identifies 9 common elements in Waltari's historical novels:
Journeys: The protagonist goes on journeys in foreign lands, is a "foreigner" in the world instead of having a home, and often has a comic sidekick. They can be called picaresque novels. Waltari himself travelled a lot, wrote two travelogues and researched his material on his trips.
Isolation: The protagonist often is an orphan, has unknown parents, or was born out of wedlock. His origins are mysterious but possibly from the highest ranks of society.
Power: The main character becomes acquainted with mighty power-holders, becoming their adviser and often admirer, and gains status and property. This kind of story of rags-to-riches via hard work is common in Finnish literature - and even mirrors Waltari's own life, as he at first relied on the help of his friends and relatives but later became a world-famous author.
A Turning Point: All novels take place at the time of a major and significant turning point in world history. The manner in which these are explored is influenced by similar turning points in Waltari's time.
Conflicts and Violence: Many kinds of battles, wars and other acts of violence are depicted (often in gruesome detail), within and between societies. Attention is devoted to multiple conflicts in a novel instead of specific single ones, and no side is portrayed as more righteous as the other. Waltari viewed that the violence of medieval torture sprung from the religious suppression of sexuality.
Rejection of Ideologies: All manipulative ideologies, which on the surface have noble goals but cause people to die in their name, are criticised. There are two common character types: The idealist, who has good intentions but brings about chaos and mayhem, and the realist, who is more immoral or even greedy and power-hungry but gets things done and achieves order and peace. According to Hejkalová, this tension between idealism and realism reflects post-World War II Finnish foreign policy: President Urho Kekkonen is the realist, who maintained the Paasikivi–Kekkonen line and preserved Finnish independence, whereas Carl Gustaf Emil Mannerheim she sees as possibly the prototypical idealist.
Good and Wicked Women: The main character has relationships with two kinds of women: There is a good but imperfect woman, who tragically dies before the hero's love for her can be fulfilled; and a beautiful but wicked femme fatale.
Witchcraft: The supernatural, mysticism and witchcraft are featured - not rationally explained away but treated as part of everyday life, as understood by the characters. There is a profound, personal relationship with God (or equivalent divine power).
Optimism: Counterintuitively in light of the above points, Waltari nonetheless holds the view that there is good among people, and that slowly, imperceptibly but inevitably humanity is headed towards goodness and salvation. Waltari paid special attention to the final parts of his novels and what mood or message they conveyed, providing a suitable uplifting catharsis.

Legacy

Recognition
Waltari got the State literature award five times: 1933, 1934, 1936, 1949, and 1953. The Pro Finlandia Medal was given to him in 1952.

The 100th anniversary of Mika Waltari's birth was celebrated by selecting the writer as the main motif for a high value commemorative coin, the €10 Mika Waltari commemorative coin, minted in 2008. The reverse depicts a vigilant Pharaoh watchdog referencing his famous book. The obverse is decorated with Waltari's signature and a stylized pen nib that symbolizes the diversity of the writer's production.

Waltari's memorial in Töölö by Veikko Hirvimäki was unveiled in 1985.

Two asteroids have been named in honour of Waltari: n:o 4266 Mika Waltari and n:o 4512 Sinuhe.

Influence
Waltari's historical novels have been cited by G. R. R. Martin and Jean Auel as an influence.

Works

Novels

Short story collections

Short stories 

 "Satu kuninkaasta jolla ei ollut sydäntä" (1945)

Comics 

 Kieku ja Kaiku (1979)

Poems

Plays

Nonfiction

References

Bibliography

Further reading

External links

 Introduction in English at WSOY.
 Mika Waltari Society (in Finnish).
 The Diary Junction Blog.
 Mika Waltari in 375 humanists. 6. March 2015. University of Helsinki.

 
1908 births
1979 deaths
Writers from Helsinki
People from Uusimaa Province (Grand Duchy of Finland)
Finnish Lutherans
Finnish historical novelists
Finnish crime writers
Finnish comics writers
Finnish mystery writers
Finnish crime fiction writers
Finnish-language writers
Writers of historical fiction set in antiquity
People with bipolar disorder
20th-century Finnish novelists
Finnish male novelists
University of Helsinki alumni
20th-century Finnish journalists